Graham Foster may refer to:

 Graham Foster (American football), American football player and coach
 Graham Foster (EastEnders), a character from the British soap opera EastEnders
 Graham Foster (Emmerdale), a character from the British soap opera Emmerdale
 Graeme Foster, Australian rugby league footballer